Ahmet Enünlü (born July 3, 1948) is a world champion Turkish bodybuilder. 

Enünlü was the fore-runner and the most successful performer of this sport in Turkey. He became the WABBA overall world champion in 1977 and 1978. In 1979, he won the overall Mr. Universe title of the National Amateur Body-Builders' Association (NABBA).

Enünlü is the grandson of Abdullah Cevdet, an Ottoman-era intellectual of Kurdish descent.

Magazine covers
 1979 	Vol 108, Num 1	Health and Strength
 1979 	Vol 108, Num 8	Health and Strength
 1979 July	Vol 47, Num 4	Strength and Health
 1979 August	Num 78	Muscle Training Illustrated
 1980 June	Num 84	Muscle Training Illustrated

References

External links
 Gym-Center 
 History of the Men's World Amateur Championships at the IFBB official site
 Vucut Gelistirme Turkey 
 Ahmet Enünlü Interview 
 Ahmet Enunlu

1948 births
Turkish bodybuilders
Living people
Turkish people of Kurdish descent